Tum Ho Ke Chup is a Pakistani television series directed by Haseeb Hassan and written by Asghar Nadeem Syed. It aired on Geo Entertainment in 2011. It stars Ayesha Khan, Humayun Saeed, Abid Ali, Hina Dilpazir and Zarrar Khan. The series revolves around the struggle of a foreign retur girl against the feudal system of Baloch culture.

Cast 

 Abid Ali as Sardar Jamal Khan
 Humayun Saeed as Mir Zarrar Khan
 Ayesha Khan as Mishal
 Hina Khawaja Bayat as Bibi Janam
 Hina Dilpazeer as Saazein Bibi
 Fiza Ali as Parivarsh
 Tehreem Zuberi as Bibi Zaitoon
 Zeba Ali as Bibi Gulbano
 Syed Jibran as Nomi
 Faisal Shah as Birbal
 Zarrar Khan as Sikander
 Shehroz Sabzwari as Zeeshan

Production 
The series was shot in Quetta, Balochistan and London, UK.

Awards and nominations

References 

2011 Pakistani television series debuts
2011 Pakistani television series endings
Urdu-language television shows
Geo TV original programming